Foreign involvement in the Syrian Civil War refers to political, military and operational support to parties involved in the ongoing conflict in Syria that began in March 2011, as well as active foreign involvement. Most parties involved in the war in Syria receive various types of support from foreign countries and entities based outside Syria. The ongoing conflict in Syria is widely described as a series of overlapping proxy wars between the regional and world powers, primarily between the US and Russia as well as between Iran and Saudi Arabia.

The Syrian government is politically and militarily supported by Iran and Russia, and actively supported by the Lebanese Hezbollah group, the Syrian-based Palestinian group PFLP-GC, and others. Since 30 September 2015, Russia, the only foreign power that has its military assets openly and legally stationed in Syria, has waged an intensive air campaign against anti-government forces in Syria, on the side of and at the request of the Syrian government. The military activity of Russia in Syria has been criticized by the US and its regional allies; Turkey overtly clashed with the Russian military in November 2015 over the alleged violation of its airspace by a Russian plane, as well as over Russia′s bombardment of the areas held by anti-government forces supported by Turkey.

The Syrian opposition, politically represented by the Syrian National Coalition, receives financial, logistical, political and in some cases military support from major Sunni states in the Middle East allied with the U.S., most notably Saudi Arabia, Qatar, and Turkey. From the early stages of the conflict in Syria, major Western countries such as the U.S, France, and the UK have provided political, military and logistic support to the opposition and its associated rebel groups in Syria.

The Syrian Democratic Forces of the Executive Council (Rojava), the government of Rojava, have received military and logistic support from some NATO countries, the US in particular. Since July 2015, it has been attacked by the Turkish military and the Turkish-backed Free Syrian Army, leading to the Turkish occupation of northern Syria.

From 2014 until October 2017, a significant part of Syria's territory was controlled by the Islamic State of Iraq and the Levant (ISIL), an entity internationally recognised as terrorist, a number of Western and other countries, most notably the U.S., Russia, Britain, and France, have participated in direct military action against ISIL in both Syria and Iraq.

Support for the Syrian government

Russia

Russia has been a military ally of Syria since 1956, and during the Syrian Civil War it continued supplying Syria's government with arms, sending military and technical advisers to train Syrian soldiers to use the Russian-made weapons, and helping to repair and maintain Syrian weapons. Investigations by reporters suggest that Russia is helping to keep the Syrian economy afloat by transporting hundreds of tonnes of banknotes into the country by airplane.

In December 2012, it was reported that Russian military personnel under the guise of military advisers were inside Syria manning some of the anti-aircraft defenses sent by Russia. The depth and sophistication of Syria's air defences was cited as a major reason for the US decision not to intervene militarily against the Syrian government or impose a no-fly zone, despite a publicly voiced commitment to do so if the Assad government crossed the "red line" of using chemical weapons.

Western leaders and diplomats have repeatedly criticized Russia's support of the Syrian government; Russia has stressed that its actions have not violated international law. In June 2012, Russian president Vladimir Putin said Russia did not support "any side [in the conflict] from which the threat of a civil war may emerge".

In December 2013, Russia was reported to have stepped up its military support for the Syrian government by supplying new armored vehicles, surveillance equipment, radars, electronic warfare systems, spare parts for helicopters, and various weapons including guided bombs for planes.

On 30 September 2015, with permission of the upper house of the Russian Parliament, Russia started a direct military intervention in Syria consisting of air strikes against ISIL, the Al-Nusra Front, and other perceived enemies of the Syrian government. The Russian Orthodox Church official spokesman called the intervention by Russia in Syria a "holy fight" (or holy struggle) against terrorism. Russia claimed the attacks were against ISIL positions. However, according to reports, the Russian air strikes targeted positions held by the Army of Conquest coalition, including the Saudi/Turkish-backed Al-Nusra Front and by Salafi-jihadi coalition known as Ahrar ash-Sham.

In autumn 2015, the US ruled out military cooperation with Russia in Syria. However, on 20 October 2015, the US and Russia signed a secret technical memorandum of understanding to avoid air incidents over Syria.

On 22 November 2015, Syria′s president Bashar Assad said that within two months of its air strikes, Russia had achieved more than the U.S.-led coalition had achieved in its fight against ISIL in a year. Two days later, the US president Barack Obama, speaking after a meeting with his French counterpart François Hollande, said: "Russia right now is a coalition of two, Iran and Russia, supporting Assad. Given Russia’s military capabilities and given the influence they have on the Assad regime, them cooperating would be enormously helpful in bringing about a resolution of the civil war in Syria, and allow us all to refocus our attention on ISIL. But I think it’s important to remember that you’ve got a global coalition organized. Russia is the outlier."

At the end of December 2015, senior US officials privately admitted that Russia had achieved its central goal of stabilising the Assad government and, with the costs and casualties relatively low, was in a position to sustain the operation at this level for years to come.

Iran

Iran and Syria are close strategic allies, and Iran has provided significant support for Syria in the Syrian Civil War. This is said to include technical support, some combat troops, and $9bn in financial support. Iran views the civil war as a critical front in an existential battle that directly relates to its geopolitical security. Iran's supreme leader, Ali Khamenei, was reported in September 2011 to be vocally in favor of the Syrian government. The Syrian city of Zabadani is vitally important to Assad and to Iran because, at least as late as June 2011, the city served as the Islamic Revolutionary Guard Corps's logistical hub for supplying Hezbollah.

In the civil uprising phase of the Syrian Civil War, Iran was said to be providing Syria with technical support based on Iran's capabilities developed following the 2009–2010 Iranian election protests. As the uprising developed into civil war, there were increasing reports of Iranian military support, partly in response to reports of increasing military support to the Syrian opposition from Persian gulf states. On 30 January 2013, about ten jets bombed a convoy believed to be carrying Russian-made SA-17 anti-aircraft missiles to Lebanon. The attack, attributed by some media reports to the Israeli Air Force, did not result in any counterattacks from Syria, although Syria has said it reserves the right to retaliate. Western intelligence sources reported that Iranian general Hassan Shateri had been killed in the airstrike. Iran acknowledged his death at the hands of the Israelis without further details. Israel refused to comment on its involvement in the incident.

In the autumn of 2015, Iran reluctantly signed on to the road map based on the 2012 Geneva Communique that was worked out during the two rounds of Syria talks in Vienna. After the meeting between Vladimir Putin and Ali Khamenei in Tehran on 23 November 2015, Iran was said to have made a decision to unify its stance vis-a-vis the Syrian leadership with Russia's.

Hezbollah 

Hezbollah has long been an ally of the Ba'ath Party government of Syria, led by the Al-Assad family. Hezbollah has helped the Syrian government in its fight against the armed Syrian opposition. As early as November 2011, The Jerusalem Post reported that protesters in Syria, enraged at Hezbollah's support for the Syrian government, burnt Hezbollah flags and images of Nasrallah, while pro-government protesters have carried posters of Nasrallah.

In August 2012, the United States sanctioned Hezbollah for its alleged role in the war. Hezbollah leader Hassan Nasrallah denied Hezbollah had been fighting on behalf of the Syrian government, stating in a 12 October 2012 speech that "right from the start the Syrian opposition has been telling the media that Hezbollah sent 3,000 fighters to Syria, which we have denied". However, he said that Hezbollah fighters have gone to Syria independently and died there doing their "jihadist duties". Hezbollah states it supports a process of reforms in Syria and is against what it calls US plots to destabilize and interfere in Syria.

In January–February 2012, Hezbollah fighters were reported to have helped the government fight the rebels in Damascus and in the Battle of Zabadani. Later that year, Hezbollah fighters crossed the border from Lebanon and took over eight villages in the Al-Qusayr District of Syria. According to the Lebanese Daily Star newspaper, Nasrallah said that Hezbollah fighters helped the Syrian government "retain control of some 23 strategically located villages [in Syria] inhabited by Shiites of Lebanese citizenship". In September 2012, Hezbollah's commander in Syria, Ali Hussein Nassif, was killed along with several other Hezbollah militants in an ambush by the Free Syrian Army (FSA) near Al-Qusayr.

According to the US, the Assad loyalist militia known as Jaysh al-Sha'bi was created and is maintained by Hezbollah and Iran's Revolutionary Guard, both of whom provide it with money, weapons, training and advice. Also, according to Israeli intelligence sources, Hezbollah is working to forge loyalist government militias into a 100,000-strong irregular army to fight alongside the government's conventional forces.

In the early period of the war, Hezbollah was involved in the Siege of Homs (2011–14), the Battle of Zabadani (2012), the Battle of al-Qusayr (2012) and the Battle of Aleppo (2011–16). On 16–17 February 2013, Syrian opposition groups claimed that Hezbollah, backed by the Syrian military, attacked three FSA-controlled Sunni villages in Al-Qusayr. An FSA spokesman said, "Hezbollah's invasion is the first of its kind in terms of organisation, planning and coordination with the Syrian regime's air force". Hezbollah said three Lebanese Shias, "acting in self-defense", were killed in the clashes with the FSA. Lebanese security sources said that the three were Hezbollah members. In response, the FSA allegedly attacked two Hezbollah positions on 21 February; one in Syria and one in Lebanon. Five days later, it said it destroyed a convoy carrying Hezbollah fighters and Syrian officers to Lebanon, killing all the passengers. The leaders of the March 14 alliance and other prominent Lebanese figures called on Hezbollah to end its involvement in Syria and said it is putting Lebanon at risk. Subhi al-Tufayli, Hezbollah's former leader, said "Hezbollah should not be defending the criminal regime that kills its own people and that has never fired a shot in defense of the Palestinians". He said "those Hezbollah fighters who are killing children and terrorizing people and destroying houses in Syria will go to hell". The Consultative Gathering, a group of Shia and Sunni leaders in Baalbek-Hermel, also called on Hezbollah not to "interfere" in Syria. They said "Opening a front against the Syrian people and dragging Lebanon to war with the Syrian people is very dangerous and will have a negative impact on the relations between the two". Walid Jumblatt, leader of the Progressive Socialist Party, also called on Hezbollah to end its involvement and claimed that "Hezbollah is fighting inside Syria with orders from Iran".

News organizations reported that Israel allegedly attacked Syria on the night between 2 and 3 May 2013. US officials said that the Israeli war planes shot into Syria from Lebanese air space, and that the warplanes did not enter Syrian air space. No counter-attacks by Syria were reported at any front, and the Syrian ambassador to the UN said that he was not aware of any attacks on Syria by Israel. Israel as well declined any comment. Another alleged attack was reported to be a set of massive explosions in Damascus on the night of 4–5 May 2013. Syrian state media described this as an "Israeli rocket attack", with the targets including a military research center of the Syrian government in Jamraya. The Daily Telegraph reported anonymous Israeli sources as saying that this was an Israeli attack on Iranian-made guided missiles allegedly intended to be shipped to Hezbollah.

Hezbollah was involved in the Al-Qusayr offensive (mid-2013) and the Battle of Qalamoun (late 2013).

In February 2015, Israeli research centre Jerusalem Center for Public Affairs published what it said was an Israeli intelligence assessment document that referenced a document allegedly produced by the United Al-Sham Front of the Free Syrian Army and purportedly exposed ″the military and terrorist infrastructure that the Iranian Revolutionary Guard Corps and Hizbullah have built on the Syrian Golan, which, according to the IDF’s intelligence branch, is also directed at Israel.″

In the 2015-18 period of the war, Hezbollah was involved in the Daraa Governorate campaign, the Battle of Zabadani (2015), Aleppo offensive (October–December 2015), Northern Aleppo offensive (2016), Wadi Barada offensive (2016–17), Aleppo offensive (June–August 2016), Daraa offensive (June 2017), Qalamoun offensive (July–August 2017), 2017 Abu Kamal offensive, Central Syria campaign (2017), the Beit Jinn offensive (2017–18), and the East Hama offensive (2017).

In September 2017, a Hezbollah commander said the group has 10,000 fighters in southern Syria ready to confront Israel.

Iraq
The Iraqi Government has sent Assad financial support since 2011. Iraq has opened its airspace for use by Iranian planes ferrying support to the Syrian government, and has granted passage through Iraqi territory to trucks bound for Syria carrying supplies from the Iranian Revolutionary Guards. The Iraqi government has signed a deal to provide Syria with diesel fuel. Iraq has struck ISIL in Deir ez-Zor several times. In December 2018, the Syrian government officially gave Iraq the green light to strike ISIL inside Syrian territory without first asking permission.

Egypt
Since the ouster of Mohamed Morsi in 2013, Egypt has been supportive of Assad, and President Abdel Fattah el-Sisi has expressed open support for Assad against ISIL. However, according to the Andalou Agency, on June 30, 2020, Egypt deployed 150 troops to Idlib. Egypt had been discussing this possibility since 2018.

Companies
A Greece-based trading company, Naftomar, is reputedly the last firm arranging deliveries of liquefied petroleum gas (LPG), but, unlike the fuel sent from Venezuela and Russia, LPG is a peaceful material that plays a vital role in countries like Syria that have limited infrastructure for piping gas. International sanctions do not apply to LPG for humanitarian reasons.

The release of WikiLeaks' "Syria Files" beginning in July 2012 led to accusations that the subsidiary of an Italian arms company had provided communications equipment to the Syrian military in May 2011, and that, as late as February 2012, its engineers gave training on the use of the communications technology, including how it could be installed in helicopters. The company said the equipment was for civilian use and said it had not sold any technology to Syria since the beginning of the uprising.

In 2013, the UK government revealed that from 2004 to 2010 British companies sold sodium fluoride, which has many civil applications, such as water fluoridation, but is also a key ingredient in the manufacture of sarin, to a Syrian firm. Between July 2004 and May 2010, the British government issued five export licenses to two companies, with the last export license issued in May 2010. The licenses are obtained prior to manufacture and the industry standard requires four to five months before the chemicals are delivered, thus allowing them to sell Syria sodium fluoride. In 2014, the UK government said that these chemicals had probably been used to manufacture chemical weapons used during the war.

Support for Syrian opposition

United States

For several initial months of the Syrian uprising that began in March 2011, the US administration headed by Barack Obama, despite pressure from some political groups, refrained from outright calls for Bashar Assad′s ouster, a move then opposed by key regional US allies such as Turkey and Saudi Arabia. First, limited sanctions against the Assad government were imposed by the US in April 2011, followed by Obama′s executive order as of 18 May 2011 targeting Bashar Assad specifically and six other senior officials. In July 2011, US Secretary of State Hillary Clinton said president Assad had “lost legitimacy.” On 18 August 2011, Barack Obama issued a written statement echoed by the leaders of the UK, France, and Germany, that inter alia said: “The future of Syria must be determined by its people, but President Bashar al-Assad is standing in their way. His calls for dialogue and reform have rung hollow while he is imprisoning, torturing, and slaughtering his own people. We have consistently said that President Assad must lead a democratic transition or get out of the way. He has not led. For the sake of the Syrian people, the time has come for President Assad to step aside." On the same day the US president signed executive orders that froze all Syrian government assets that were under US jurisdiction, barred Americans from doing business with the government, and prohibited the import of Syrian oil and petroleum products to the United States. The US sanctions were called by Syria’s U.N. ambassador Bashar Jaafari "a humanitarian and diplomatic war against us." Under the administration's division of labor, the State Department is in charge of supplying nonlethal aid (includes food rations and pickup trucks, not tanks and bullets), while the US Central Intelligence Agency (CIA) runs a covert program to arm and train the Syrian rebels.

In June 2012, the CIA was reported to be involved in covert operations along the Turkish-Syrian border, where agents investigated rebel groups, recommending arms providers which groups to give aid to. Agents also helped opposition forces develop supply routes, and provided them with communications training. CIA operatives distributed assault rifles, anti-tank rocket launchers and other ammunition to Syrian opposition. The State Department had then reportedly allocated $15 million for civilian opposition groups in Syria. In July 2012, the US government granted a non-governmental organization called Syrian Support Group a license to fund the Free Syrian Army. In 2016, a number of US officials revealed that the CIA in 2012 proposed a detailed covert action plan designed to remove Bashar Assad from power, but president Obama declined to approve it.

In early March 2013, a Jordanian security source revealed that the U.S., Britain, and France were training non-Islamist rebels in Jordan in an effort to strengthen secular elements in the opposition as a bulwark against Islamic extremism, and to begin building security forces to maintain order in the event of Assad's fall. In April 2013, also in Jordan, the United States had set up a $70 million program in the country "that is training the kingdom's special forces to identify and secure chemical-weapons sites across Syria should the regime fall and the wrong rebels look like getting their hands on them."

In April 2013, the Obama administration promised to double non-lethal aid to rebels, specifically to $250 million. On 13 June 2013, US government officials said the administration, after days of high-level meetings, had approved providing lethal arms to the Supreme Military Council (SMC). The decision was made shortly after the administration concluded that the Assad government had used chemical weapons on opposition forces, thus crossing the "red line" declared by Obama earlier in 2012. The arms to be provided included small arms and ammunition, and possibly anti-tank weapons. However, they were not to include anti-aircraft weapons, something repeatedly requested by the armed opposition. Further such weapons would be supplied by the US "on our own timeline".

In mid-June 2013, the US government said it would now arm rebels in Syria and would consider a no-fly zone in Syria′s southern border with Jordan to allow a safe place to equip and train rebels.

The US government′s rhetorical reaction to the use of chemical agents in Ghouta on 21 August 2013, which was formally ascribed by the Obama administration to the Syrian government, prompted the news media to conclude at the end of August that "the US was on the verge of military strikes against the Assad regime". Nevertheless, the president opted not to strike. The decision disappointed some within the US political establishment.

During September 2013, it was reported by US officials that under "a covert CIA program," small arms and anti tank weapons had begun reaching some moderate rebel groups. Although Free Syrian Army Commander Salim Idris denied receiving lethal aid, some analysts commented that information on US arms may not have reached Idris due to poor communications as the Free Syrian Army command was based in Northern Syria whilst weapons were reportedly reaching rebel groups in the south.

In late 2013, Islamist groups left the SMC to form the Saudi-backed Islamic Front (Syria), which engaged in combat with SMC brigades. In December 2013, the US government temporarily suspended the shipments of non-lethal military aid, including food rations, medical kits and pickup trucks after warehouses of equipment were seized by the Islamic Front.

In April 2014, videos appeared online that showed rebels in Syria using U.S.-made anti-tank rockets (BGM-71 TOW), the first significant American armaments in the country's conflict; analysts suggested they might have been provided by states such as Saudi Arabia, a US ally, with Washington's acquiescence. As US policy shifted to combating ISIL, the SMC declared war on ISIL in late 2014.

By early 2015, voices in the US foreign policy establishment were pushing for an abandonment of the rebels due to their operational weakness and collaboration with Islamist hardliners. US policy increasingly focused on supporting Kurdish-led forces against ISIL. In early October 2015, shortly after the start of the Russian military intervention in Syria, Barack Obama was reported to have authorised the resupply — against ISIL — of 25,000 Syrian Kurds and 5,000 of the armed-Syrian opposition, emphasising that the US would continue this support now that Russia had joined the conflict. In October 2015, the US also announced the end of the Pentagon’s $500 million program to train Syrian rebels to only fight ISIL and not Assad in an acknowledgment that the program had failed in achieving its ostensible goals. Instead the funding would be used to provide weapons and ammunition to rebel groups already in place. Another covert and significantly larger program in Syria, Timber Sycamore, was being run by the CIA and continued under the Barack Obama administration. By October 2015 it was estimated that 42 anti Assad groups had been vetted by the CIA.

Jane's Defence Weekly reported a US shipment of 994 tonnes of weapons and ammunition (including packaging and container weight) in December 2015 from Eastern Europe to Syrian rebel groups, including 9M17 Fleyta anti-tank missiles, RPG-7s, AK-47S, DShKs, and PKMs. A detailed list of weapon types and shipment weights had been obtained from the US government's Federal Business Opportunities website.

On 7 April 2017 the United States launched a series of 59 Tomahawk missiles at a Syrian airbase in Shayrat following the Khan Shaykhun chemical attack. Shortly after, the US Central Command acknowledged the stationing of the US "special forces" at Al-Tanf in Southern Syria since early 2016, after the US troops were engaged in direct combat action against ISIL on 8 April.

In July 2017, it was reported that the Donald Trump administration had decided to halt the CIA program to equip and train anti-government rebels, a move sought by Russia. According to David Ignatius, writing in The Washington Post, while the CIA program ultimately failed in its objective of removing Assad from power, it was hardly "bootless": "The program pumped many hundreds of millions of dollars to many dozens of militia groups. One knowledgeable official estimates that the CIA-backed fighters may have killed or wounded 100,000 Syrian soldiers and their allies over the past four years."

On 14 November 2017, Syrian and Russian state media reported that the Foreign Ministry of Syria reaffirmed that it considered the presence of the US forces, or any other foreign military presence, in Syria without the approval of the Syrian government ″an act of aggression and an attack on the sovereignty of the Syrian Arab Republic″ and rejected what it described as the U.S.′ attempt to connect the US military presence in Syria with the settlement process.

United Kingdom

Since August 2011, Britain insists, along with the US and France and some Arab states, that the Syrian president Bashar Assad must step down.

In June 2012, following unconfirmed reports from an Israeli website that SAS Commandos were conducting covert operations within Syrian territory, operating from Turkey on 26 June 2012, it was reported that the prospect of British special forces entering Syria on the ground was growing.

In 2012, the UK provided opposition forces with non-lethal military aid, including communications equipment and medical supplies, and the UK was reported to have provided intelligence support from its Cyprus bases, revealing Syrian military movements to Turkish officials, who then passed on the information to the Free Syrian Army.

On 29 August 2013, a vote was held in the British House of Commons to decide whether the United Kingdom would join the United States in initiating militant action against the use of chemical weapons by the Syrian government: the Prime Minister David Cameron′s motion was defeated by 285 votes to 272. Although the prime minister does not need parliamentary approval for military action, Cameron said that he would respect this Parliamentary decision and that the UK would not take part in military action in Syria.

Mid November 2015, the UK co-sponsored a French-drafted UN Security Council resolution urging UN members to "take all necessary measures" in the fight against ISIL and al-Nusra Front.
On 20 November 2015, the UN Security Council unanimously passed the French-British drafted-sponsored resolution.
British Ambassador to the U.N. Matthew Rycroft said the resolution would be used by prime minister David Cameron to address Parliament on his plans to begin airstrikes by the UK in Syria.

On 3 December 2015, after the UK parliament overwhelmingly backed the UK government′s motion to extend the UK military action to Syria, four Tornados from RAF air base in Cyprus carried out their first air strikes against ISIL in Syria targeting the Omar oil fields in eastern Syria, according to defence minister Michael Fallon.
France welcomed that UK military action; Syria, noting that the UK had failed to ask permission from Syria's government, insisted Britain and its allies must follow Russia's example and co-ordinate their campaign with Syrian government forces.

In early February 2016, the UK foreign minister Philip Hammond, referring to the Russia′s air campaign in support of the Syrian government, said: "It's a source of constant grief to me that everything we are doing is being undermined by the Russians."

In August 2016, the BBC published photographs taken in June that year that it said showed British special forces soldiers apparently guarding the perimeter of the New Syrian Army's base at al-Tanf (Al Waleed) in Syria's Homs province on the Syria-Iraq border that had been previously seized by ISIL militants in May 2015. The troops were shown to be equipped with four-wheel drive Al-Thalab vehicles and a range of weapons which included sniper rifles, anti-tank weapons and heavy machine guns.

By 2018 over £2.7 billion of spending had been committed on non-military programmes associated with the civil war.

France

Before the civil war, Assad was seen as a key patron by France; viewing Syria as part of its colonial legacy. Syrian army was a major benefactor of French arms and supplies. Assad was hailed as a reformer in the French media and his authoritarian style was glossed over. Assad enjoyed close ties with French presidents and was also a receipt of Légion d’honneur, the foremost French order of merit. However, after the outbreak of the Syrian refugee crisis since August 2011, France insists, along with the US and Britain and some Arab states, that the Syrian president Bashar Assad must step down, France—a former mandatory ruler of Syria—being considered by The Guardian more active and forward than the other Western countries in its policy towards the war in Syria.

In 2012, France provided opposition forces with non-lethal military aid, including communications equipment and medical supplies. In August 2013, when the Assad government was accused of using chemical weapons in the Ghouta area near Damascus, Paris called for military intervention but was isolated after the US president, Barack Obama, refused to act despite the breach of what he had earlier declared was a “red line”.

On 19 September 2013, French President François Hollande during a press conference in Bamako suggested that France was ready to begin supplying lethal aid to the Free Syrian Army in a "controlled framework".
End of September 2015, France has begun airstrikes in Syria, on a small scale to avoid inadvertently strengthening the hand of president Bashar Assad by hitting his enemies.

In August 2014 French President François Hollande confirmed that France had delivered arms to Syrian rebels.

In mid-November 2015, in the wake of the 13 November Paris terror attacks, France, citing self-defence under Article 51 of the United Nations Charter, significantly intensified its air strikes in Syria, closely coordinating with the US military.

Also mid November, France drafted a UN Security Council resolution urging UN members to "take all necessary measures" in the fight against ISIL and al-Nusra Front.
The following day the French-drafted resolution was co-sponsored by the UK.
On 20 November 2015, the UN Security Council unanimously passed the French-British drafted-sponsored resolution.
Also on 20 November, France dismissed Russia′s suggestions that the French air strikes against oil installations in Syria were illegal, saying they were "an appropriate and necessary riposte" to attacks by ISIL.

On 3 December 2015 the UK started air strikes against ISIL in Syria. France welcomed the UK's military action.

LaFarge Cement company acknowledged that it had funneled money to ISIS in 2013 and 2014. LaFarge's defense was that the fiduciary support for ISIS was to maintain the "safety" of its employees. French courts dropped the charges against LaFarge in 2019. Hillary Clinton sat on the board of LaFarge cement company between 1990 and 1992.

Turkey

The government of Turkey, a NATO member with the alliance's second largest army, has had a relatively friendly relationship with Syria over a decade prior to the start of the civil unrest in Syria in 2011; Turkey, while joining calls for the Syrian government to end the violence, initially objected to the demand voiced in August 2011 by the US that Bashar Assad resign. Turkey trained defectors from the Syrian Army on its territory, and in July 2011 a group of them announced the birth of the Free Syrian Army. In October 2011, Turkey began sheltering the Free Syrian Army, offering the group a safe zone and a base of operation. Together with Saudi Arabia and Qatar, Turkey has also provided the rebels with arms and other military equipment. Tensions between Syria and Turkey significantly worsened after Syrian forces shot down a Turkish fighter jet in June 2012 and border clashes in October 2012. In early February 2016, Reuters referred to Turkey as "a major sponsor of the insurgency against President Bashar al-Assad". Turkey provided refuge for Syrian dissidents from early days of the Syrian conflict. In early June 2011, Syrian opposition activists convened in Istanbul to discuss regime change, and Turkey hosted the head of the Free Syrian Army, Colonel Riad al-Asaad. Turkey became increasingly hostile to the Assad government's policies and came to encourage reconciliation among dissident factions. Recep Tayyip Erdoğan has tried to "cultivate a favorable relationship with whatever government would take the place of Assad." In May 2012, Syrian opposition forces started to receive arms and training from Turkey and the United States. Turkey's subsequent arrangements with Russia and Iran (from early 2017) caused a rift in its relationship with the Syrian opposition, as the opposition leaders criticized Russia's plan to create safe zones in Syria as threatening the country's territorial integrity.

Turkey maintained a small enclave within Syria itself, the Tomb of Suleyman Shah on the right bank of the Euphrates in Aleppo Province near the village of Qarah Qawzak (Karakozak). Up until Syrian forces shot down a Turkish warplane in June 2012, the garrison numbered 15 men in total. Following the incident, the Turkish government doubled the number of soldiers stationed at the tomb to 30, while Prime Minister Erdoğan warned that "the tomb of Suleyman Shah and the land that surrounds it are Turkish territory. Any act of aggression against it would be an attack on our territory and NATO territory." In February 2015, the army launched a raid into Syria in order to move the tomb closer to the border.

Until September 2014, Turkey did not overtly participate in the international airstrikes against ISIL. Turkey had repeatedly said it wanted the US to focus its air strikes in Syria as much on removing Assad as on fighting the ISIL; it had also demanded a "safe zone" in the area extending from the Syrian town of Kobanî on the Turkish border, westward to the town of Azaz, that would be protected by air power and that was purported to enable Turkey to transfer back to Syria some of an estimated 1.8 million displaced people camped on Turkish territory.

In October 2014, U.S. Vice President Joe Biden stated that Turkey, Saudi Arabia and the United Arab Emirates had "poured hundreds of millions of dollars and tens of thousands of tons of weapons into anyone who would fight against Al-Assad, except that the people who were being supplied were al-Nusra, and al Qaeda, and the extremist elements of jihadis coming from other parts of the world."

On 22 July 2015, Turkey agreed to let the US use the Incirlik Air Base in southern Turkey to launch air attacks against the ISIL, a deal that was seen as a major shift in policy on the part of the once-reluctant American ally (in March 2003, the Turkish parliament voted against allowing Turkey to be a base of operations for the U.S. invasion of Iraq).

At the end of July 2015, American and Turkish media outlets reported that the US government and Turkey had agreed on the outlines of a de facto "safe zone" along the Turkey-Syria border under the terms of a deal that was purported to increase the scope and pace of the U.S.-led air missions against the ISIL in northern Syria; the plan provided for driving ISIL, the al-Nusra Front, and other radical groups out of a 68-mile-long area west of the Euphrates River and reaching into the province of Aleppo that would then come under the control of the Syrian opposition. The operational status of the envisioned area was to stop short of meeting Turkish demands for a full-scale, declared no-fly zone. In August 2015, the US announced it would withdraw two Patriot missile-defense batteries from southern Turkey in the autumn that year; also withdrawn were the German Patriots stationed in Turkey, amidst concerns in the NATO military establishment that Turkey was intent on dragging NATO into the Syrian conflict.

In late July 2015, the outlawed PKK, designated as a terrorist organization by UN, EU and many countries including USA as well as Turkey, resumed fighting against the government in the Kurdish-dominated southeastern parts of Turkey. On 29 June 2015, Turkey′s National Security Council made a decision and released a statement that said that Turkey would consider any incursion west of the Euphrates in northern Syria along the Turkish border (the area between Jarablus in the east and the Azaz–Mare' region in the west) by Kurdish YPG militia, backed by the Democratic Union Party (PYD), as well as any attack north of Idlib by Syrian government forces to be a violation of the “red line.” (The PYD is deemed by Turkey to be the Syrian affiliate of PKK, but it is actively aided by the U.S.) At the end of October 2015, Turkish prime minister Ahmet Davutoğlu claimed that Turkey had struck Kurdish YPG militia fighters in Syria twice for the alleged breach of the "red line"; the YPG′s statements said that the Turkish army had twice attacked its positions near the border towns of Tell Abyad and Kobanî. In mid-November 2015, president Recep Erdoğan reaffirmed this threat not to allow Kurdish YPG militia to cross over to the western side of the Euphrates along the Turkish border.

On 24 November 2015, speaking shortly after the shootdown of a Russian Su-24 by Turkey, Russian president Vladimir Putin characterised the role played by Turkey in the Syrian conflict as that of "the accomplices of terrorists." Russia′s foreign minister Sergey Lavrov claimed that the Turkish plan to create a buffer zone in the area where Syrian Turkmen lived in northern Syria stemmed from Ankara's wish "to protect local terrorist infrastructure." Many Turkish and Western analysts as well as officials questioned that ISIL oil was being imported into Turkey, argued that Moscow′s accusations of the Turkish government in this regard were unfounded.

In late November 2015, following Russian President Putin directly accusing Turkey of aiding ISIL and al-Qaeda, Turkey came under pressure from the US to close the remaining crossing point for ISIL militants on a 60-mile stretch of the border with Syria where ISIL had control of the Syrian side.

On 2 December 2015, Russia′s military officials presented what they referred to as "only part of the available facts" that proved that Turkey′s president Recep Erdogan and his family were personally involved in a multimillion-dollar oil smuggling operation that funded ISIL terrorists. The accusations were seen as further drastic escalation of tensions between Turkey and Russia that has its military personnel and advanced weapons openly deployed in Syria. Both the Turkish government and the Iraqi Kurdish Regional Government (KRG) denied this. Commenting on the allegations, John R. Bass, the US Ambassador to Turkey, told the press that the claims about the Turkish government's involvement in ISIL oil trade were unfounded, citing the official apology issued by the CIA with regards to the allegations in 2014.

On 24 February 2015, president Erdogan speaking on television of the tentative plan for a cessation of hostilities in Syria announced by Russia and the US two days prior, accused the UN, the West, Russia and Iran of seeking to further their own interests in Syria and said he feared a U.S.-Russian ceasefire plan would do little more than benefit Syria′s president Bashar Assad.

In late December 2015, in an interview for Al Arabiya Turkey′s president Recep Erdogan said, "Syria, Iran, Iraq and Russia have formed a quartet alliance in Baghdad and asked Turkey to join, but I told President [Vladimir] Putin that I cannot sit alongside a president whose legitimacy is distrustful."

After Syria′s Kurdish YPG militia captured Syria′s Menagh Airbase and several settlements north of Aleppo near the border with Turkey, Turkey on 13 February 2016 began a sustained campaign of shelling the YPG positions in the area of Azaz from its territory. In response to this action qualified by Syria as a violation of its sovereignty as well as the alleged infiltration into Syria of "Turkish soldiers or Turkish mercenaries", the Syrian government requested that the UN Security Council take action. The attempt by Russia on 19 February 2016 to have an appropriate resolution adopted by the UN Security Council was undermined by Western powers, including the US, the UK, and France.

Since August 2016, the Turkish military have conducted a series of cross-border operations in Syria, mainly fighting against the Kurdish YPG militia forces, supported by the U.S., that controlled the northern parts of Syria.

Arab League
Sunni Arab states are concerned that the Iranian arms transfers are changing the balance of power in the region and has "become a regional contest for primacy in Syria between Sunni Arabs and the Iran-backed Assad government and Hezbollah of Lebanon." Iran is using the Maharaj Airlines to ship weapons to Syrian government.

On 6 March 2013, the Arab League gave its members the "green light" to arm the Syrian rebels. On 26 March 2013, at the Arab league summit in Doha, the League recognised the National Coalition for Syrian Revolutionary and Opposition Forces, as the legitimate representatives of the Syrian people.

Qatar

The Financial Times reported that Qatar had funded the Syrian rebellion by "as much as $3 billion" over the first two years of the civil war. It reported that Qatar was offering refugee packages of about $50,000 a year to defectors and family.

The Stockholm International Peace Research Institute estimated that Qatar had sent the most weapons to Syria, with over 70 weapons cargo flights into Turkey between April 2012 and March 2013.

Qatar operates a training base in its territory, in conjunction with the CIA who run the training, training about 1,200 rebel soldiers a year on three week courses.

Jordan

From at least the 2014 June Offensive in Iraq, ISIL leadership threatened to overthrow the monarchy of Jordan through invading Jordan once it took Baghdad (which ISIL never succeeded in doing). The Jordanian Air Force joined in the US-led bombing of ISIL in Syria. ISIL retaliated by firing into Jordan and sniping incidents increased at the border.

On 24 December 2014, a Jordanian fighter jet was shot down over Syria and its pilot, Jordanian Air Force lieutenant Muath Al-Kasasbeh, captured. This pilot was executed by burning in January 2015 and was later used to attempt to recover jailed terrorists. Jordan offered to make the exchange, but demanded "proof of life" first, this wasn't done, and the video of the pilot's execution was released. In response, the terrorists, Sajida al-Rishawi and Ziad al-Karbouli, were executed and Jordan took the lead on anti-ISIL bombing raids, claiming nearly a thousand militants were killed by air strikes in a week.

In mid-2015 there were reports of plans for an invasion of Syria in order to set up a buffer zone within that country and away from its own border. This invasion never materialized.

Saudi Arabia

The Financial Times reported in May 2013 that Saudi Arabia was becoming a large provider of arms to the rebels. Since the summer of 2013, Saudi Arabia has emerged as the main group to finance and arm the rebels. Saudi Arabia has financed a large purchase of infantry weapons, such as Yugoslav-made recoil less guns and the M79 Osa, an anti-tank weapon, from Croatia via shipments shuttled through Jordan. The weapons began reaching rebels in December 2012 which allowed rebels' small tactical gains this winter against the army and militias loyal to Assad. This was to counter shipments of weapons from Iran to Assad's forces.

Bashar al-Assad pointed at Saudi Arabia as the major supporter of terrorists and "leading the most extensive operation of direct sabotage against all the Arab world".

In May 2015, The Independent reported that Saudi Arabia and Turkey were "focusing their backing for the Syrian rebels on the combined Jaish al-Fatah, or the Army of Conquest". The Army of Conquest reportedly includes an Al-Qaeda-linked Al-Nusra Front, which had been declared a terrorist organisation by the United States.

In October 2015, Saudi Arabia delivered 500 U.S.-made TOW anti-tank missiles to anti-Assad rebels. According to Russian President Vladimir Putin, the weapons would "certainly fall into the hands of terrorist organizations".

In mid-December 2015, in the wake of the two rounds of the Vienna talks, Saudi Arabia hosted a conference of Syria's political and armed opposition factions that was intended to come to an agreement on a common position from which to negotiate with the government of Bashar al-Assad. The meeting, that did not include the major Kurdish factions in Syria, produced a statement of principles to guide peace talks with the government; it said inter alia that president Assad would be allowed to stay until a transitional government was formed. The meeting decided to set up a "Higher Negotiations Authority" to direct the opposition's participation in the proposed talks with the regime early in 2016; that leadership body is to remain based in Riyadh, giving the Saudis a ready handle on it. Shortly afterwards, the Saudis announced the formation of a military alliance of Muslim countries to fight international terrorism; about 30 Muslim states (all of them Sunni-majority nations) were reported to join the alliance, including Egypt and Turkey. The coalition was seen by Russia and Iran as aimed at reinforcing Saudi Arabia′s leadership and countering their efforts in the region, yet meaningless in practical terms.

In early February 2016, a Saudi military official announced, ″The kingdom is ready to participate in any ground operations that the coalition (against ISIL) may agree to carry out in Syria.″ Saudi sources elaborated that the putative deployment of Saudi special forces could be carried out in coordination with Turkey.

Croatian weapons
In December 2012, a new wave of weapons from foreign supporters were transferred to rebel forces via the Jordanian border in the country's south. The arms included M79 Osa anti-tank weapons and M-60 recoilless rifles purchased by Saudi Arabia from Croatia. Previously, most of the weapons were delivered via the Turkish border in the north. However, much of the arms unintentionally ended up in the hands of Islamist rebels. The goal for the change in routes was to strengthen moderate rebels and to bring the war closer to Damascus.

According to Jutarnji list, a Croatian daily newspaper, there were an unusually high number of sightings of Ilyushin 76 aircraft owned by Jordan International Air Cargo at Pleso Airport in Zagreb, Croatia on 14 and 23 December 2012; 6 January; and 18 February 2013. In early January 2013, Yugoslav weapons were seen used in battles in the Dara'a region near Jordan. Then, in February 2013, Yugoslav weapons were seen in videos posted by rebels fighting in the Hama, Idlib, and Aleppo regions. Danijela Barišić of Croatia's Foreign Ministry and arms-export agency denied that such shipments had occurred. Saudi officials have declined requests for interviews about the shipments for two weeks. Ukrainian-made rifle cartridges, Swiss-made hand grenades, Belgian-made rifles are showing up in the rebels' hands but the origin is not clear because Saudi Arabia has insisted on secrecy.

Bandar bin Sultan
In August 2013 the Wall Street Journal reported that Saudi Prince Bandar bin Sultan had been appointed to lead Saudi Arabia's efforts to topple Syrian President Bashar al-Assad, and that the US Central Intelligence Agency considered this a sign of how serious Saudi Arabia was about this aim. Bandar was described as "jetting from covert command centers near the Syrian front lines to the Élysée Palace in Paris and the Kremlin in Moscow, seeking to undermine the Assad regime." After tensions with Qatar over supplying rebel groups, Saudi Arabia switched its efforts from Turkey to Jordan in 2012, using its financial leverage over Jordan to develop training facilities there, overseen by Bandar's half-brother Salman bin Sultan. In late 2012 Saudi intelligence also began efforts to convince the US that the Assad government was using chemical weapons. The Saudi government also would be sending prisoners sentenced to death to fight in Syria.

Swiss weapon sales controversies

In July 2012, Switzerland ceased arms exports to the UAE after it emerged Swiss weapons were finding their way to opposition fighters. The Swiss decision came shortly after the UN human rights chief, Navi Pillay, called for an urgent stop to arms transfers to government and opposition forces so as to avoid "further militarisation" of the conflict. The director of the Saban Center for Middle East Policy had previously argued that, while "uncontrolled militarization will turn the Syrian uprising into a wider conflict that could draw in jihadis and other extremists from across the Muslim World", militarisation was inevitable, and so the US should help facilitate and guide it. Marc Lynch argued the opposite in February 2012, as the provision of weapons from Saudi Arabia and Qatar was being mooted: "It is unlikely that arms from the outside would come close to evening the balance of power, and would only invite escalations from Syrian regime forces".

Support from non-state groups
The Free Iraqi Army allowed soldiers and supplies to cross from Al Anbar Governorate into Syria. Sunni armed groups inside in the western Sunni-majority provinces of Iraq formed the Free Iraqi Army in an effort to emulate the FSA, and supported the Syrian rebels until August 2014, when the Free Iraqi Army was overtaken by ISIL.

In February 2012, Al-Qaeda's chief Ayman al-Zawahiri called on Muslims from other countries to support anti-government forces in Syria.

Support for Rojava

The Rojava conflict has seen substantial military and logistic support from the Combined Joint Task Force – Operation Inherent Resolve (CJTF–OIR) coalition for the Syrian Democratic Forces (SDF) since 2014. The SDF has been strongly supported with foreign air power in the Rojava-Islamist conflict, but not when it has fought Turkey, a NATO ally of many of the members of the CJTF–OIR coalition. Diplomatic support for Rojava has been limited, with the Syrian Democratic Council usually uninvited to the various international negotiations around the Syrian peace process.

In April 2016 a France 24 documentary reported the presence of French, British, and US special forces cooperating with the Syrian Democratic Forces to coordinate airstrikes against ISIL during the al-Shaddadi offensive (2016) in February.

In late April 2016, the US announced imminent deployment to Syria of additional 250 US troops to provide training to the Syrian Democratic Forces. Shortly thereafter, 150 of these troops were reported to have arrived in Rmelan, al-Hasakah Governorate, in an area controlled by the Kurdish YPG militia, from Iraqi Kurdistan. The deployment prompted the Syrian government′s strong condemnation of what it called a ″blatant act of aggression that constitutes a dangerous intervention and a gross violation of the Syrian sovereignty.″ In mid-August 2016, the Pentagon said the U.S.-led coalition′s F-22 aircraft flew over the area around the city of Al-Hasakah in a "very unusual" move to protect American special operation ground forces from attacks by Syrian government jets.

In late November 2017, the US government made it known that they intended to use the presence of US troops in northern Syria, deployed there in support of the Kurdish-dominated SDF, to pressure president Assad to make concessions at the talks in Geneva. This intent was in mid-January 2018 clearly broadcast by Rex Tillerson, who said the Trump administration would maintain an open-ended military presence in Syria to counter Iran′s influence and oust Syrian president Bashar Assad. However, in April 2018 the Saudi foreign minister, Adel al-Jubeir, said that they were in discussions with the US on finding replacement forces for the about 2,000 US troops in Syria supporting the fight against ISIL, to address the Trump administration's desire to withdraw them.

On 18 September 2020, the US military announced that it was deploying Bradley fighting vehicles, advanced radar and more fighter jet patrols in north-eastern Syria to protect US troops fighting ISIS, amid tensions with Russia.

Support for the Islamic State
Until 2015, the Turkish government had maintained a border regime that was referred to by commentators and Turkish journalists as the "Jihadist Highway" where militants including potential ISIL fighters and other radical groups could come and go freely.

In July 2015, a raid by US special forces on a compound housing ISIL's "chief financial officer", Abu Sayyaf, produced evidence that Turkish officials directly dealt with ranking ISIL members.

Individual foreign nationals' support for rebels/jihadist groups

There have been a number of foreign fighters that had joined the Syrian Civil War in opposition to Assad. While some are jihadists, others, such as Mahdi al-Harati, joined to help the Syrian rebels. Some fighters came from as far away as Chechnya and Tajikistan.

Several groups, such as the Abdullah Azzam Shaheed Brigade, al-Nusra Front and Fatah al-Islam have stated that they conducted operations in Syria. Jihadist leaders and intelligence sources said foreign fighters had begun to enter Syria only in February 2012. In May 2012, Syria's U.N. envoy Bashar Ja'afari declared that dozens of foreign fighters from Libya, Tunisia, Egypt, Britain, France and elsewhere had been captured or killed, and urged Saudi Arabia, Qatar and Turkey to stop "their sponsorship of the armed rebellion". In June, it was reported that hundreds of foreign fighters, many linked to al-Qaeda, had gone to Syria to fight against Assad. In July, Iraq's foreign minister again warned that members of al-Qaeda in Iraq were seeking refuge in Syria and moving there to fight. When asked if the United States would arm the opposition, Hillary Clinton expressed fears that such weapons could fall into the hands of al-Qaeda or Hamas. In October 2012, the United States expressed concern and confirmed that most of the weapons fall into the hands of radical Islamist rebels.

In July 2016, the British press cited "experts" as believing that ISIL fielded at least three exclusively Russian-speaking "Caucasian" (often led by Chechens) battalions of about 150 men each, the rank and file of those having been drawn from Russia's North Caucasus and other parts of the former Soviet Union.

Role of regional states

Israel

Israel's military role in the Syrian Civil War has been limited and until 2017 officially not acknowledged, whereas Syria and Israel have technically been in a state of war since 1948, albeit without major open hostilities after the 1973 conflict. Israeli official position had until 2017 been neutrality in the civil war in Syria. Until the March 2017 strike, Israel's reported attacks on targets inside Syria were low-profile operations, for which Israel did not assume responsibility.

In early July 2017, Israel's defence minister Avigdor Liberman said that while "the rebels are not our friends, they are all versions of al-Qaida", Israel could not allow a man like Assad to remain in power: "Keeping Assad in power is not in our security interests. As long as he is in power, Iran and Hezbollah will be in Syria." He said that Israel had no interest in entering the Syrian civil war, but there were "red lines" Israel had set, such as the smuggling of sophisticated weaponry to Hezbollah and Iran's presence on its borders. Later in July 2017, the Israeli government said it opposed the cease-fire agreement in southern Syria that the United States and Russia had reached a week prior that envisaged establishing de-escalation zones along Syria's borders with both Jordan and Israel, as that would legalise Iran's presence in Syria.

In July 2017, the Israeli military said that they had since June 2016 run Operation Good Neighbor, a multi-faceted humanitarian relief operation focused on providing care to Syrian children.

By early December 2017, the Israeli air force had confirmed it had attacked arms convoys of the Syrian government and Lebanon's Hezbollah nearly 100 times during within over six years of the conflict in Syria.

On 22 July 2018, Israel carried out an evacuation of some 400 people, including 98 White Helmets, from former rebel-controlled territory in the southwest through the part of Golan Heights it controls and transferred them to Jordan. The operation was effected at the request of Western governments as the lives of the White Helmets were considered to be in danger in view of the Syrian government's successful offensive in southwestern Syria.

Lebanon

Lebanon's role in the Syrian Civil War has been limited, compared to the role of other regional and international actors. Lebanon is not officially involved in the conflict as a belligerent state, but has been greatly affected by it.

Since 2011, Lebanon has absorbed Syrian refugees as well as provided humanitarian aid. According to the UNHCR, there were over 1 million Syrian refugees who had been registered in Lebanon in 2016. Nevertheless, this figure is likely largely underestimated since the UNHCR has stopped registering new Syrian refugees since May 2015 and it doesn't include individuals awaiting to be registered. Hence, precise figures of the number of Syrian people in Lebanon don't exist currently. Recent estimates were as high as 1,500,000 people.

Between 2011 and 2017, fighting from the Syrian Civil War spilled over into Lebanon as opponents and supporters of the Syrian rebels travelled to Lebanon to fight and attack each other on Lebanese soil. The Syrian conflict has been described as having stoked a "resurgence of sectarian violence in Lebanon", with many of Lebanon's Sunni Muslims supporting the rebels in Syria, while many Shi'ites have supported Assad, whose Alawite minority is usually described as an offshoot of Shi'a Islam. Killings, unrest, and kidnappings of foreign citizens across Lebanon resulted.

Hezbollah involvement in the Syrian Civil War has been substantial since the beginning of armed insurgency phase of the Syrian Civil War, and turned into active support and troop deployment from 2012 onwards. By 2014, Hezbollah involvement begun to turn steady in support of Syrian Ba'athist Government forces across Syria. Hezbollah deployed several thousand fighters in Syria and by 2015 lost up to 1500 fighters in combat. Hezbollah has also been very active to prevent rebel penetration from Syria to Lebanon, being one of the most active forces in the Syrian Civil War spillover in Lebanon.

Opposition to foreign involvement

Many people and organisations take the view that opposes any foreign involvement in the Syrian Civil War. Protests occurred in London in August 2013 against foreign intervention in Syria shortly before a Parliamentary vote on airstrikes in Syria, which was defeated. Later protests that drew thousands in London in November 2015 called for the United Kingdom not to bomb Syria shortly before another Parliamentary vote in early December 2015. This view was also backed in a letter sent to Prime Minister David Cameron by 23 prominent figures including musicians, writers and trade union officials, that included Frankie Boyle, Brian Eno, Caroline Lucas, John Pilger and Jeremy Hardy. The 2015 vote was won by the Government and authorised military airstrikes in Syria. Protests against military action in Syria also occurred throughout the United Kingdom in April 2018, from towns and cities such as Bristol, Exeter, Swansea and Milton Keynes. This was following proposed further airstrikes in Syria alongside the United States against Syrian government forces for allegedly possessing chemical weapons. The British Campaign for Nuclear Disarmament described the decision of the government to carry out airstrikes in Syria as defying international law and criticised Prime Minister Theresa May for bypassing parliament in her decision on the matter.

In April 2017, protests occurred across a number of U.S. cites, as well as in Canada and Italy, against foreign intervention in Syria. Protestors held placards displaying phrases such as “No War on Syria!” and “Hands off Syria!”.

See also

Campaign Against Arms Trade
Dutch involvement in the Syrian Civil War
Iran–Saudi Arabia proxy conflict
List of armed groups in the Syrian Civil War
Spillover of the Syrian Civil War
Syrian Civil War
Syrian Civil War peace process

References

External links

 
Foreign relations of Syria
Lists of the Syrian civil war